Tiger trap may refer to:
Trou de loup, also known as tiger trap, a medieval booby trap
Tiger Trap, an American pop band
Tiger Trap (album), their 1993 self-titled debut